The year 642 BC was a year of the pre-Julian Roman calendar. In the Roman Empire, it was known as year 112 Ab urbe condita . The denomination 642 BC for this year has been used since the early medieval period, when the Anno Domini calendar era became the prevalent method in Europe for naming years.

Events
 The interregnum in Rome ends. Ancus Marcius becomes the fourth king of Rome.

Births

Deaths
 Wukui, ruler of the state of Qi

References